Wesmaelius is a genus of net-winged insects, belonging to the family Hemerobiidae.

The genus was described in 1922 by Krüger.

The genus has cosmopolitan distribution.

Species:
 Wesmaelius brunneus (Banks, 1920)
 Wesmaelius coloradensis (Banks, 1897)
 Wesmaelius constrictus (Parfin, 1956)
 Wesmaelius fumatus (Carpenter, 1940)
 Wesmaelius furcatus (Banks, 1935)
 Wesmaelius involutus (Carpenter, 1940)
 Wesmaelius longifrons (Walker, 1853)
 Wesmaelius longipennis (Banks, 1920)
 Wesmaelius mathewesi Makarkin, Archibald, & Oswald, 2003
 Wesmaelius nervosus (Fabricius, 1793)
 Wesmaelius posticatus (Banks, 1905)
 Wesmaelius pretiosus (Banks, 1908)
 Wesmaelius schwarzi (Banks, 1903)
 Wesmaelius subnebulosus (Stephens, 1836)
 Wesmaelius yukonensis Klimaszewski & Kevan, 1987

References

Hemerobiiformia